Vendace can refer to several species of fish, but especially these species of freshwater whitefish:
Coregonus albula, widespread in northern continental Europe
Coregonus vandesius, in lakes of Scotland and England; arguably the same species as Coregonus albula

 It can also refer to:
USS Vendace (SS-430), a Balao-class submarine
Vickers Vendace, a British trainer aircraft of the 1920s